Eleven on the River is a  tall skyscraper in Minneapolis, Minnesota, USA, located at 1111 W River Pkwy. Completed in 2022, Eleven has 42 floors and 120 units. It is the 7th-tallest building in Minneapolis, and the tallest residential building in Minnesota.

It was designed by New York City architecture firm Robert A.M. Stern Architects. Ryan Companies US, Inc. served as co-developer and builder.

See also
List of tallest buildings in Minneapolis
List of tallest buildings in Minnesota

References

Apartment buildings in Minnesota
Residential skyscrapers in Minneapolis
Buildings and structures completed in 2022
Skyscrapers in Minneapolis